Park Kyong-nang (born ) is a South Korean female volleyball player.

She was part of the South Korea women's national volleyball team at the 2005 FIVB World Grand Prix.
On club level she played with Korea Tobacco & Ginseng.

Clubs
  Korea Tobacco & Ginseng (2005)

References

External links
PIVB profile
 FPV - Federação Paulista de Volleyball

1984 births
Living people
South Korean women's volleyball players